George Edgar Horton (January 14, 1910 – February 15, 1992) was a Canadian politician. He served in the Legislative Assembly of New Brunswick from 1962 to 1978 as member of the Progressive Conservative party.

References

1910 births
1992 deaths
Progressive Conservative Party of New Brunswick MLAs